Albert Edwin Lynch (10 December 1900 – 23 August 1976) was a musician and Catholic priest.

Lynch was born in Collie, Western Australia to Ernest Lynch and Elizabeth Lynch (née Stewart). He was raised an Anglican and educated at state schools. He received his first musical training from Sister Monica at St Joseph's Convent in Boulder.

In the early 1920s his talent as a violinist earned him a place in orchestras supporting silent movies and enabled him to perform solo recitals on the wireless. Joseph Nowotny became his mentor. The Rivervale Progress Association sponsored the first of a series of concerts to raise the £1000 needed to send Lynch to Belgium in 1923 to study under Emile Marchot at the Conservatoire Royal de Musique de Bruxelles for three and a half years. During his time in Belgium he was converted to Catholicism.

Lynch began to study for the priesthood at Pontifical Urban College of Propaganda Fide, Rome in 1930. Lynch was ordained priest in St John Lateran Basilica on 16 March 1935.  He returned to Western Australia where he was appointed curate of Palmyra in October 1935. In 1938 he formed an all-male choir at St Mary's Cathedral, Perth, which he conducted for fifteen years. In conjunction with Christian Brothers' College, St George's Terrace, he established Western Australia's first Catholic choir school. He served on the music examinations board of the University of Western Australia.

He was the college chaplain of Aquinas College in Salter Point from 1938 to 1942. He was to become the founding parish priest of Applecross in 1952, which he dedicated to St. Benedict.

In 1969 Lynch composed the "Parish congregational mass in honour of the unsung saints". Music from this mass has been used in most Sunday services by St James the Great, St Kilda East Anglican Church since soon after its composition.

Lynch stayed at Applecross parish until he retired in 1973.

Lynch died on 23 August 1976 at Applecross and was buried in Karrakatta Cemetery.

References 
 Mulcahy, Clement, 'Lynch, Albert Edwin (1900–1976)', Australian Dictionary of Biography, National Centre of Biography, Australian National University, http://adb.anu.edu.au/biography/lynch-albert-edwin-10877/text19309, accessed 8 January 2012.

1976 deaths
1900 births
20th-century Australian Roman Catholic priests
Australian violinists
Male violinists
Burials at Karrakatta Cemetery
People from Collie, Western Australia
Staff of Aquinas College, Perth
20th-century violinists
20th-century Australian musicians
20th-century Australian male musicians